The beetle subfamily Aulacoscelidinae (sometimes misspelled "Aulacoscelinae") is a small, uncommonly-encountered group presently classified within the family Orsodacnidae, historically placed as a subfamily of Chrysomelidae, or sometimes classified as a separate family Aulacoscelidae. There are only 19 species, mostly Neotropical in distribution, and their larval habits are unknown.

References 

Orsodacnidae